Ikwechegh is a Nigerian surname of Igbo origin. Notable people with the surname include:

Amadi Ikwechegh (1951 – 2009), military governor of Imo State, Nigeria
Alex Mascot Ikwechegh, Nigerian politician, businessman and philanthropist

Igbo-language surnames